Strauss Glacier is a glacier, 40 nautical miles (70 km) long, flowing between the Ickes Mountains and Coulter Heights to enter the sea at the east side of Land Bay, Marie Byrd Land. Mapped by United States Geological Survey (USGS) from surveys and U.S. Navy air photos, 1959–65. The naming was proposed to Advisory Committee on Antarctic Names (US-ACAN) by Admiral Richard E. Byrd. Named for Lewis Strauss, Chairman of the Atomic Energy Commission, 1953–58, longtime friend and advisor to Admiral Byrd who recommended that the Antarctic be used to demonstrate peaceful employment of atomic energy.

References

Glaciers of Marie Byrd Land